Saint-Sulpice-de-Cognac (literally Saint-Sulpice of Cognac) is a commune in the Charente department in the Nouvelle-Aquitaine region in southwestern France.

Population

Its inhabitants are known as San Sulpicians or Sulpicians.

Climate
Saint-Sulpice-de-Cognac, as the whole region of Cognac, is located west of the department of Charente and has a marine climate.

See also
Communes of the Charente department

References

Communes of Charente
Charente communes articles needing translation from French Wikipedia